Shot in the Dark was an American documentary television series that premiered on Netflix on November 17, 2017. The eight-episode first season explores the story of stringers in Los Angeles, California.  The series follows three companies that do stringing in the Los Angeles TV News Market. It follows stringing companies OnScene.TV, LoudLabs LLC and RMGNews as they compete to get the shot that sells to the news.

The show features the same subject matter and many of the same people as the 2007 series Stringers: LA.

Episodes

References

External links
 
 

2017 American television series debuts
2010s American documentary television series
English-language Netflix original programming
Netflix original documentary television series
True crime television series